Aidan Keena (born 25 April 1999) is an Irish footballer who plays as a forward for Cheltenham Town. He has previously played for St Patrick's Athletic, Heart of Midlothian, Hartlepool United,  Queen's Park, Dunfermline Athletic, Falkirk and Sligo Rovers.

Club career

St Patrick's Athletic
Keena, a member of the St Patrick's Athletic under 19's squad, was called up to the first team by manager Liam Buckley for pre-season in January 2017 despite being just 17 years old. He scored on his first team debut, in a 5–0 win over Bluebell United in a friendly. Keena made his first official appearance in senior football on 24 February 2017 when he came on as a 67th-minute substitute in the Saints opening game of the season against Bray Wanderers. With Pats trailing 2–0, Kenna set up Graham Kelly for an 85th-minute goal before being shown a straight red card in the 91st minute for a late tackle on Dylan Connolly. Keena went on to make four more appearances for the club (two league and two League Cup) in the 2017 season, with the last of those being a Dublin Derby against Bohemians on 16 June 2017.

Heart of Midlothian
Keena was signed by Heart of Midlothian in August 2017. After impressing first team staff with his goalscoring form for the reserves, he was called up to the first team and made his debut as a late substitute in a 1–1 draw versus Partick Thistle at Tynecastle Park on 19 November 2017. Keena was loaned to Scottish League One club Queen's Park in January 2018. In August 2018, he joined Dunfermline Athletic in the Scottish Championship on a season-long loan.

After a promising few months with Dunfermline, Keena was recalled to Hearts in January, scoring his first goal for the club in a 4–0 victory against Auchinleck Talbot in the Scottish Cup.

Hartlepool United
Keena left Hearts in January 2020 and signed for Hartlepool United. Prior to this, Keena had unsuccessful trials with Darlington and Berwick Rangers.

He scored his first goal for the club in a 2–0 win against Stockport County on 25 January 2020.

Falkirk
After leaving Hartlepool, Keena returned to Scotland and signed a two-year deal with Scottish League One side Falkirk on 5 August 2020. On 24 January 2022, it was announced that Keena had left Falkirk by mutual consent after 8 goals in 38 appearances for the club.

Sligo Rovers
On 24 January 2022, Keena signed for League of Ireland Premier Division club Sligo Rovers and quickly established himself. Keena made his debut on 25 February 2022, scoring the winner in a 2–1 victory away to his first senior club St Patrick's Athletic. On 14 March 2022, he scored a hat-trick in a 3–1 win over Finn Harps at The Showgrounds. Keena was named League of Ireland Player of the Month for March 2022, following a great start to life at his new club, scoring 5 goals in his first 6 appearances. He scored a brace in a 3–1 win at home to Shelbourne on 2 July 2022, his 10th and 11th goals of the season, to return to the top of the goal scoring charts in the league. On 7 July 2022, he scored on his debut in European football, scoring the equaliser in a 2–1 win away to Welsh side Bala Town in the UEFA Europa Conference League. On 21 July 2022, Keena scored the winning goal in a 1–0 victory away to Motherwell in the UEFA Europa Conference League. He was named League of Ireland Player of the Month for July 2022, his second time winning the award. Keena finished the 2022 season as League of Ireland Premier Division top goalscorer with 18 goals. He ended the 2022 season with 21 goals in all competitions, two in the UEFA Conference League, one in the FAI Cup and eighteen in the league. He played a huge role in the attack for Rovers that year, also contributing 5 assists. Despite finishing as the top goalscorer and with 2 Player of the Month awards, he was not nominated for PFAI Players' Player of the Year.

Cheltenham Town 
On 29 January 2023, Keena signed for Cheltenham Town for an undisclosed fee, reported as surpassing the club's previous record transfer of £50k.

International career
Keena has represented the Republic of Ireland at Under-17, Under-18 and Under-19 level. On 6 November 2019, Keena was announced in Stephen Kenny's Republic of Ireland U21 side for the first time, for their European Under-21 Championship qualification games against Armenia U21 & Sweden U21.

Career statistics

Honours

Individual
League of Ireland Premier Division Top Scorer: 2022
League of Ireland Player of the Month (2): March 2022, July 2022

References

External links

1999 births
Living people
Sportspeople from County Westmeath
Heart of Midlothian F.C. players
Scottish Professional Football League players
League of Ireland players
Republic of Ireland association footballers
Association football forwards
St Patrick's Athletic F.C. players
Republic of Ireland youth international footballers
Expatriate footballers in Scotland
Republic of Ireland expatriate association footballers
Queen's Park F.C. players
Dunfermline Athletic F.C. players
Hartlepool United F.C. players
Expatriate footballers in England
Falkirk F.C. players
Sligo Rovers F.C. players
Irish expatriate sportspeople in Scotland
Irish expatriate sportspeople in England
Cheltenham Town F.C. players
National League (English football) players